The Only One (Spanish: La única) is a 1952 Cuban musical film directed by Ramón Peón and starring Rita Montaner.

Cast
 Miguel del Castillo 
 Harry Mimmo
 Rita Montaner 
 Enrique Montaña 
 Maritza Rosales

References

Bibliography 
 Alfonso J. García Osuna. The Cuban Filmography: 1897 through 2001. McFarland, 2003.

External links 
 

1952 films
1950s Spanish-language films
Cuban musical films
1952 musical films
Films directed by Ramón Peón